is a Japanese professional basketball player for the Shinshu Brave Warriors club of the B.League in Japan.

He represented Japan's national basketball team at the 2015 FIBA Asia Championship in Changsha, China, where he was the team's best 3-point shooter.

Career statistics 

|-
| align="left" |  2013-14
| align="left" | Chiba
| 39|| 37|| 33.2|| .370|| .341|| .616|| 5.1|| 1.8|| 0.8|| 0.2||  14.3
|-
| align="left" |  2014-15
| align="left" | Chiba
| 46||43 || 30.8|| .371|| .332|| .750|| 3.8|| 1.8|| 1.0|| 0.3||  12.2
|-
| align="left" |  2015-16
| align="left" | Chiba
| 55||55 || 28.6|| .343|| .284|| .676|| 4.1|| 1.8|| 0.7|| 0.3|| 8.6 
|-
| align="left" |  2016-17
| align="left" | Chiba
| 60 ||  60||31.2  ||.411  ||.398  ||.670  ||3.1  ||2.4  || 0.6 ||0.2  || 12.3
|-
| align="left" |  2017-18
| align="left" | Chiba
| 59 ||  59||27.1  ||.402  ||.365  ||.656  ||3.0  ||3.3  || 0.6 ||0.3  || 11.3
|-
|}

References

External links
 FIBA profile - 2017 FIBA Asia Cup
 FIBA profile - FIBA Olympic Qualifying Tournament 2016
 Asia-basket.com profile
 Real GM profile

1988 births
Living people
Alvark Tokyo players
Basketball players from Tokyo
Chiba Jets Funabashi players
Forwards (basketball)
Japanese men's basketball players
Asian Games bronze medalists for Japan
Asian Games medalists in basketball
Basketball players at the 2014 Asian Games
Medalists at the 2014 Asian Games